Albert Edward Tye (1883 – 25 January 1917) was an English professional footballer who played in the Football League for Chesterfield Town and Burton United as a left half and left back.

Personal life 
Following his football career, Tye lived in Burton upon Trent and worked as a painter. On 22 January 1915, six months after the outbreak of the First World War, Tye enlisted as a private in the Prince of Wales's (North Staffordshire Regiment). While serving as an appointed lance corporal, he was killed in action at the Hai Salient, near Kut, Iraq, on 25 January 1917. He is commemorated on the Basra Memorial.

Career statistics

References

1883 births
1917 deaths
Burials in Iraq
Footballers from Derbyshire
English footballers
Burton United F.C. players
Chesterfield F.C. players
North Staffordshire Regiment soldiers
Association football wing halves
Association football fullbacks
English Football League players
British Army personnel of World War I
British military personnel killed in World War I
Missing in action of World War I
Military personnel from Derbyshire
20th-century English painters
English male painters
20th-century English male artists